Surin is a town in Thailand, capital of Surin Province,  east-northeast of Bangkok. It is the site of the annual Surin Elephant Round-up. , Surin has an estimated population of 39,179.

Etymology
The first part of the name Sur- originates from the Sanskrit word Sura (Devanagari: सुर) meaning "God" (cf. Asura), and the second part -in(thara) from Sanskrit is "Indra" (Devanagari: इन्द्र). Hence the name of the province literally means Lord Indra.

Geography
In the north of the province is the valley of the Mun river, a tributary of the Mekong. To the south of the province is the Dongrek mountain chain, which also forms the boundary to Cambodia. The central and northern parts of the province are undulating flood plains.

Climate
Surin has a tropical savanna climate (Köppen climate classification Aw). Winters are dry and warm. The monsoon season runs from late April through early October, with heavy rain and somewhat cooler temperatures during the day, although nights remain warm.

History

Prehistory
The earliest settlers in this region were hunter-gatherers. The Neolithic, with the introduction of agriculture, dates from 2,500 to 1,500 years BCE. The Bronze Age dates from 1,500-500 BCE and the Iron Age from 500 BCE to 500 CE. It is in the Iron Age that the first evidence of human settlement emerges in the province, with approximately sixty known Iron Age sites.

Historical period
The earliest known historical period is the Dvaravati. This was an Indian-based culture, which diffused through the north-east region of what is now Thailand. Evidence of this culture is found in Surin region dating to between the 7th to 11th centuries CE. It was in this period that Buddhism became the dominant religion of the region.

Following the Dvaravati period, the powerful Khmer Empire expanded its influence throughout what is now the southern Isan region of Thailand. This period covers the 7th to 13th centuries CE. Surin was an important part of the ancient Khmer empire. Temple ruins and a substantial ethnic Khmer minority remain part of Surin. Khmer stone inscriptions date from c. 600 CE. Over the next several centuries a growing number of Khmer sites were constructed in the province, most notably Prasat Sikhoraphum. These sites would have formed part of the network of Khmer infrastructure centred on Prasat Phanom Rung.

With the collapse of the Khmer empire in the 13th century Surin province faded from history. It is in the 18th century that it re-emerges. At this time a Kuay local leader named Chiangpum became the royally appointed ruler of the region. According to legend he presented a rare white elephant to the Chao Phaya Chakri, future King Rama I. In gratitude, Chiangpum was awarded the royal title Luang Surin Phakdi and appointed the village headman. When Rama I became the Thai monarch, he appointed Luang Surin Phakdi as  the province's governor. In 1763 the village was moved to the location of the modern city of Surin, and was upgraded to a city with the name Muang Prathai Saman. There is a local legend that this move was due to better water supplies at the new site. Also, that the original location of the town was at Muang Thi, approximately fifteen kilometres to the east of the modern city. In 1786, the city's name was changed to Surin in honor of its governor.

The province slowly grew in population, there was a continual influx of people from surrounding areas, principally Cambodia (part of what is now western Cambodia was ruled by Bangkok at this time), however Surin was largely self-sufficient, and somewhat isolated. This changed with the advent of the railroad in 1922. Surin and its economy was exposed to the wider world. Chinese and Indian merchants settled, manufacturing increased and Surin joined the modern world.

Transportation
The town is served by Surin Airport, which as of 2021, lacked any commercial-passenger or cargo-airline services. Buriram Airport is nearby and with two passenger airlines serving it, it is the closest airport with airline services.

See also

 Surin Province
 Mueang Surin District

References

External links

Populated places in Surin province
Cities and towns in Thailand
Isan